Aeropuerto is a ward (barrio) of Madrid belonging to the district of Barajas.  Its borders are coterminous with those of the Adolfo Suárez Madrid-Barajas Airport, after which it is named.

References

Wards of Madrid
Barajas (Madrid)